Three Brothers is a 1981 Italian film based on a work by Andrei Platonov. It was directed by Francesco Rosi and stars Philippe Noiret, Vittorio Mezzogiorno, Michele Placido and Charles Vanel.

The film won the Boston Society of Film Critics award for Best Foreign Film, and the Nastro d'Argento for Best Director and Actor. It received a nomination for an Academy Award for Best Foreign Language Film. It was screened out of competition at the 1981 Cannes Film Festival.

Plot

An elderly woman, the matriarch of an Italian family, passes away in a farmhouse in southern Italy. Donato, her husband, summons their three adult kids from the cities where they now reside, each of whom is dealing with challenging personal issues, back to their farmhouse. Raffaele, one of their sons and a judge in Rome, is thinking about preside over a terrorism case where he would be at risk of being assassinated. In order to pursue his desire of assisting troubled youths, another son, Rocco, who resides in Naples, is devout and works as a counselor in a boys' penal facility. Nicola, the third son, resides in Turin and works as a militant factory worker engaged in a labor conflict while juggling a broken marriage.Each of the men deals with his grief in his own unique way while simultaneously battling other emotional problems. The sons reflect on the past and daydream about the future: Raffaele visualizes his demise, Rocco dreams of rescuing Naples' youth from crime, drugs, and corruption, and Nicola sees himself hugging his estranged wife. While grieving together, the elderly man and his tiny granddaughter, Nicola's child, explore the farm's rhythms.

Cast
 Philippe Noiret - Raffaele Giuranna
 Michele Placido - Nicola Giuranna
 Vittorio Mezzogiorno - Rocco Giuranna and young Donato
 Andréa Ferréol - Raffaele's wife
 Maddalena Crippa - Giovanna
 Rosaria Tafuri - Rosaria
  - Marta
 Tino Schirinzi - Raffaele's friend
 Simonetta Stefanelli - young Donato's wife
 Pietro Biondi - first judge
 Charles Vanel - Donato Giuranna
  - first friend at bar
 Luigi Infantino - second friend at bar
 Girolamo Marzano - Nicola's friend
 Gina Pontrelli - the brothers' mother

See also
 List of submissions to the 54th Academy Awards for Best Foreign Language Film
 List of Italian submissions for the Academy Award for Best Foreign Language Film

References

External links

1981 films
1981 drama films
French drama films
Italian drama films
1980s Italian-language films
Films directed by Francesco Rosi
Gaumont Film Company films
Films about families
Films shot in Matera
1980s Italian films
1980s French films
Italian-language French films